Elisabeth "Ellis" Kaut (17 November 1920 – 24 September 2015) was a German author of children's literature, best known for her creation of Pumuckl, a kobold appearing in radio plays and TV series. She also published novellas and some illustrated books.

Life 
Ellis Kaut was born in Stuttgart. Her parents moved to Munich with her when she was two years old. In 1938, aged 18, Ellis Kaut was elected the first official Münchner Kindl for that year. In 1939 she married author Kurt Preis, continuing to live in Munich. They had a daughter, Ursula, born in March 1945. Ellis Kaut received actor's training, then studied sculpting. From 1948 she was a freelance author and also had some speaking parts in radio plays in the 1950s and 1960s. She supervised children's programmes at Bayerischer Rundfunk, but was also active as a painter and photographer. In a 2010 interview, Ellis Kaut said that writing was always hard work for her.

Ellis Kaut's husband died in 1991. Her last place of residence was in the district of Pasing in Munich. She died after a long illness on 24 September 2015, aged 94, in a nursing home near Fürstenfeldbruck.

Honors and awards 
 1938: First Münchner Kindl
 1955: Bayerischer Hörspielpreis
 1971: Schwabinger Kunstpreis
 1980: Cross of Merit 1st Class of Verdienstorden der Bundesrepublik Deutschland
 1980: Medal „München leuchtet“
 1984: Ernst-Hoferichter-Preis
 1985: Bayerischer Verdienstorden
 1992: Bayerischer Poetentaler
 1999: Oberbayerischer Kulturpreis
 2001: Pro meritis scientiae et litterarum
 2002: Bayerische Verfassungsmedaille in silver

References

External links 
 Ellis Kaut's website
 

1920 births
2015 deaths
20th-century German writers
German children's writers
German women children's writers
German women illustrators
German children's book illustrators
Photographers from Munich
Officers Crosses of the Order of Merit of the Federal Republic of Germany
Writers from Munich
20th-century German women